The golden bowerbird (Prionodura newtoniana) is a species of bird in the family Ptilonorhynchidae, the bowerbirds. It is endemic to Queensland in Australia, where it is limited to the Atherton region.

Distribution
The golden bowerbird has a patchy distribution in northeastern Queensland. It has a limited range and its population is thought to have declined as much as 60% over three generations of the species. It is a near-threatened species on the IUCN Red List, with the primary threat being climate change. This bird lives in rainforests above  in elevation, including some habitat that has been disturbed by human activities such as logging.

Description 
The male golden bowerbird has a brown head and brown wings which are bright yellow-gold underneath, as are the tail, crest and nape. The female is olive brown with ash-gray underparts. Immatures look similar to the female except their eyes are brown. This is the smallest species of bowerbird.

Habitat 
The habitat of the golden bowerbird is upland rainforests from 350 and 1530 meters. Traditional bowerbird habitats include mild slopes, ridges immediately surrounding hill crests, and below steeper slopes where terrain levels off; canopy coverage is often greater than 70%; none on hilltops or in disturbed forest.

Life history

Like most other bowerbirds, the male builds and maintains a bower over several years. Males do not grow their adult plumage for at least five or six years, during which time they wander, learn the social hierarchy of mature males, and practice building bower-like structures. Upon maturity, a male establishes his bower site, builds his structure, and spends much time decorating it. He may steal decorations from his neighbours, and defend his possessions from other males. During the breeding season, generally August through December, the male perches at his bower and produces a number of vocalizations, which attract females.

The female establishes a nest in cup-shaped crevices, usually in tree trunks. There are one to two eggs per clutch. The nestlings are fed fruit and insects, and fledging occurs most often in January.  The life span ranges from 6 to 30 years, depending on the species.

Diet and foraging 
The golden bowerbird feeds mainly on fruits, and sometimes takes insects and spiders. Fruits, especially those from vines, as well as flowers, buds, and arthropods. Nestlings eat largely fruits and a few insects, mostly cicadas (Cicadidae), with the percentage of fruit rising as the nestling grows older. Fruits and insects are eaten by fledglings. In the Paluma Range, males cache fruits, especially bunches of wild pepper (Piper), in crevices surrounding bower sites to be recovered for later use; one nesting female was spotted retrieving a cached fruit. Forages by sallying and seeking; cicadas are infrequently hawked. Usually eats alone; however, 3–4 (often juvenile) individuals may forage in the same fruiting canopy with other bird species, including other bowerbirds.

Sounds and vocal behavior 
Peak calling season is September–December. The sounds the golden bowerbird makes vary by populations. However, the typical male call song is a pulsating rattle note, which lasts 1-2 seconds and is repeated several times. Other kinds of calls include: squeals, screeches, scold-rasps, or wolf-whistle notes or a medley of them; also high-quality mimicry of calls of other bird species. In addition, the male birds are known to respond more strongly to the local dialects than foreign dialects. This means that when one of the male birds recognizes the call they respond in a different manner than if they did not recognize the call.

Conservation status 

The golden bowerbird's population is very well conserved. They do not face a threat of extinction and are very well protected in their habitat. In past years, the birds faced the threat of logging in their habitat; however, this did not present a big threat to the birds. Their habitat is now also environmentally protected so the threat of extinction and decline in population is very minimal.

Gallery

References

External links
BirdLife Species Factsheet

golden bowerbird
Birds of Cape York Peninsula
Endemic birds of Australia
golden bowerbird